Glycaspis is a genus of plant-parasitic hemipterans in the family Aphalaridae. There are at least two described species in Glycaspis.

Species
These two species belong to the genus Glycaspis:
 Glycaspis brimblecombei Moore, 1964 (red gum lerp psyllid)
 Glycaspis granulata (Froggatt, 1901)

References

Further reading

 

Aphalaridae